Gary Fraser (born 2 July 1994) is a Scottish professional footballer, who plays as a midfielder for Broomhill.

Fraser began his career with Hamilton Academical, and has since played for Bolton Wanderers, Partick Thistle, Greenock Morton, Cowdenbeath and Peterhead.

Career

Early career
Fraser was in the Celtic youth system, before making his professional debut for Hamilton Academical on 27 August 2011. He turned down a move to English club Bolton Wanderers in January 2013. He was released by Hamilton in May 2013.

Fraser scored twice as a trialist for Partick Thistle in a pre-season friendly against Annan Athletic in a 5–1 victory in early July 2013.

On 11 July 2013 it was announced that Fraser had signed a two-year contract with Bolton Wanderers.

Partick Thistle

On 23 July 2013 he moved to Partick Thistle on a 6-month loan deal. After attacking an opponent in an U20 league fixture against Dunfermline Athletic in October 2013, Fraser was cited by the SFA compliance officer and faced a potential one-year ban from Scottish football. Fraser was eventually banned for a total of nine games, running until 1 January 2014. The ban ends three days before his loan deal expires, and the club stated they were considering extending it. On 6 January 2014, Fraser returned to Bolton after his loan with Partick Thistle came to an end. Four days later, on 10 January 2014, he signed a permanent two-and-a-half-year contract with Thistle.

Following a successful survival campaign in the 2013–14 Scottish Premiership season, Fraser signed a further contract, keeping him at Firhill until 2017. Fraser suffered a serious knee injury that caused him to miss the whole of the 2016/17 season. He signed a short-term contract with Thistle in the summer of 2017, and made his first competitive appearance for 18 months in November 2017. In December, Fraser apologised for hitting a Celtic supporter by kicking a football into the stand. In early January, his contract was extended to the end of the 2017–18 season.

Fraser was loaned to Championship club Greenock Morton in March 2018. Partick Thistle were relegated via the playoffs at the end of the 2017/18 season. Following that relegation, Fraser was one of many players released by Thistle.

During the 2018 close season, Fraser signed for Forfar Athletic. Later that season he signed for Cowdenbeath.

He moved to Broomhill in May 2022.

Career statistics

References

1994 births
Living people
Scottish footballers
Celtic F.C. players
Hamilton Academical F.C. players
Bolton Wanderers F.C. players
Partick Thistle F.C. players
Scottish Football League players
Association football defenders
Association football midfielders
Scottish Professional Football League players
Greenock Morton F.C. players
Forfar Athletic F.C. players
Cowdenbeath F.C. players
Peterhead F.C. players
Footballers from Glasgow
Broomhill F.C. (Scotland) players
Lowland Football League players